Hepinglu station is a station of Line 3 and Line 4 of the Tianjin Metro. It started operations on 1 October 2012.

Currently, due to continuous engineering, free transfer gateway between Line 3 and Line 4 isn't available, passengers that need transfer between two lines require an out-of-station transfer by using tickets other than oneway tickets within 30 minutes.

Exits

Exit A: Tianjin Association for science and Technology

Exit B: Tianjin Stomatological Hospital

Exit C: Teemall

Exit D: Heping Road Shopping Street, Binjiang Ave. Shopping Street, Goubuli Shop, Central Park, Bohai Tower, China Unicom Business Center, Zhang Xueliang Historical Residence, and Porcelain House Museum.

Exit G: Siping East Ave. Primary School

Exit H: Siping East Ave. Primary School and Tianjin Stomatological Hospital

Exit E is currently closed for renovation. There are also numerous connections to the Tianjin public bus system. Tianjin Tower is located on Heping Road, about 500 meters from the station.

References

Railway stations in Tianjin
Railway stations in China opened in 2012
Tianjin Metro stations